José Fontes Rocha (Ramalde, 20 September 1926 – 15 August 2011) was a Portuguese fadista and instrumentalist. For many years he was accompanist to Amalia Rodrigues.

References

1926 births
2011 deaths
Portuguese fado guitarists